Jan Ostrowski (born 14 April 1999) is a Luxembourgian professional association footballer who plays as a midfielder for Swift Hesperange and the Luxembourg national team.

Club career
Ostrowski joined Miedź Legnica in Poland in the summer 2019, and previously featured for the youth sides of 1. FSV Mainz 05, Eintracht Frankfurt and FC Zürich.

International career
Ostrowski was born in Luxembourg and is of Polish descent. He made his international debut for Luxembourg in 2017 in a friendly against Albania.

References

External links
 
 

1999 births
Living people
Luxembourgian people of Polish descent
Luxembourgian footballers
Association football midfielders
Luxembourg international footballers
Luxembourg youth international footballers
I liga players
III liga players
Luxembourg National Division players
Miedź Legnica players
FC RM Hamm Benfica players
FC Swift Hesperange players
Luxembourgian expatriate footballers
Luxembourgian expatriate sportspeople in Poland
Expatriate footballers in Poland
Luxembourgian expatriate sportspeople in Germany
Expatriate footballers in Germany
Luxembourgian expatriate sportspeople in Switzerland
Expatriate footballers in Switzerland